Improvised Meditations & Excursions is a jazz recording by John Lewis released in 1959.

Track listing
All tracks composed by John Lewis, except where indicated.

Side 1
"Now's the Time" (Charlie Parker)
"Smoke Gets in Your Eyes" (Jerome Kern)
"Delaunay's Dilemma"
"Love Me"

Side 2
"Yesterdays" (Jerome Kern)
"How Long Has This Been Going On" (George Gershwin)
"September Song" (Kurt Weill, Maxwell Anderson)

Liner notes
The liner notes by Horst Lippmann, a German jazz critic of the time, provide additional notes and influences in Lewis' jazz work on this and some of his other releases.

Personnel

On "Now's The Time", "Smoke Gets In Your Eyes", "Delaunay's Dilemma" and "September Song":
John Lewis – piano
George Duvivier – bass
Connie Kay – drums

On "Love Me", "Yesterdays" and "How Long Has This Been Going On":
John Lewis – piano
Percy Heath – bass
Connie Kay – drums

All tracks engineered by Earle Brown and Frank Abbey.

References

 

1959 albums
Instrumental albums
John Lewis (pianist) albums
Albums produced by Nesuhi Ertegun
Atlantic Records albums